Dario Nicola Marzino (born 19 September 1996) is a Swiss professional footballer who plays as a goalkeeper for the Swiss club Young Boys.

Professional career
Marzino is a youth product of Dürrenast and Thun, before moving to the youth academy of Young Boys in 2012. From 2013 to 2019, he was the starter with Young Boys reserve side. In the summer of 2015, he was formally promoted to Young Boys' senior team, where he acted as backup goalkeeper. He made his senior and professional debut with Young Boys as a late substitute on 3 August 2020, a 3–1 win over FC St. Gallen to end their Championship winning season and replacing Marco Wölfli in his last ever game. He was the backup goalkeeper for Young Boys as they won consecutive league titles from 2017 to 2020. He joined Winterthur on a season-long loan in the Swiss Challenge League on 8 September 2020. On 24 September 2021, he moved to Schaffhausen once more in the Swiss Challenge League. He returned to Young Boys as the third goalkeeper for the 2022-23 season.

International career
Marzino is a youth international for Switzerland, having played for the Switzerland U20s in 2016.

Honours
Young Boys
Swiss Super League: 2017–18, 2018–19, 2019–20
Swiss Cup: 2019–20

References

External links
 
 

1996 births
Living people
People from Thun
Swiss men's footballers
Switzerland youth international footballers
Swiss people of Italian  descent
BSC Young Boys players
FC Winterthur players
FC Schaffhausen players
Swiss Super League players
Swiss Challenge League players
Swiss 1. Liga (football) players
Association football goalkeepers